The Montserrat slave rebellion of 1768 was an unsuccessful slave rebellion in the English colony of Montserrat in the Caribbean Sea that took place on 17 March 1768.

Background
Irish planters began to settle Montserrat in the 1630s following tensions with the British in nearby St Kitts and started importing African slaves in 1650 to work on the island's cotton, tobacco, and sugarcane plantations. By the late 1760s, as a result of dwindling provisions, labour shortages and increasingly strict oversight, slaves faced worsening living conditions.

Uprising
By 1768, slaves outnumbered white colonialists by three to one, and black and creole Montserratians, led by the slave Cudjoe, decided to stage an uprising against the plantation owners. St Patrick's Day, 17 March, was chosen as the day of the uprising as the rebels knew that their masters would be drinking heavily on St Patrick's Day.

The rebels planned for domestic slaves at Government House to seize any weapons held there while other slaves would arm themselves with rocks, farm tools, clubs and homemade swords but the plot was disclosed by a female slave, leading to a successful quashing of the rebellion.

Repercussions
Nine rebels, including Cudjoe, were hanged, and his head placed on a silk-cotton tree as a warning to slaves considering another revolt. Thirty other rebels were imprisoned and then banished to other islands.

The uprising was forgotten until 1971 when Monserratian scholars discovered references to the rebellion and began to publicise it. In 1985 the Government of Montserrat declared 17 March a national holiday.

St Patrick's Day is now the centrepoint of a ten day festival honouring the rebellion and its members.

References

Sources
 Bush, B. (1990) Slave Women in Caribbean Society 1650-1838, Heinemann Publishers: Kingston, Jamaica. ISBN 085255 058 8.
 Fergus, H. (1996) Gallery Montserrat: Some Prominent People In Our History, Canoe Press, Montserrat. ISBN 976-8125-25-X.
 Ryzewski, K. & Cherry, J. (2015) "Struggles of a Sugar Society: Surveying Plantation-Era Montserrat, 1650–1850", International Journal of Historical Archeology, 19 (2).

Slave rebellions in North America